Glanworth
is a rural locality and county of Queensland in Australia. Glanword is located on the Westphalia Creek about 760km west-northwest from Brisbane, and at an elevation of approximately 366m above sea level.

Like all counties in Queensland, it is a non-functional administrative unit, that is used mainly for the purpose of registering land titles. From 30 November 2015, the government no longer referenced counties and parishes in land information systems however the Museum of Lands, Mapping and Surveying retains a record for historical purposes.

The entire county is incorporated

References 

Counties of Queensland